A macroscopic quantum state is a state of matter in which macroscopic properties, such as mechanical motion, thermal conductivity, electrical conductivity and viscosity, can be described only by quantum mechanics rather than merely classical mechanics. This occurs primarily at low temperatures where little thermal motion is present to mask the quantum nature of a substance.

Macroscopic quantum phenomena can emerge from coherent states of superfluids and superconductors. Quantum states of motion have been directly observed in a macroscopic mechanical resonator (see quantum machine).

References

Quantum mechanics